This is a list of cities in Uzbekistan. , Uzbekistan has 120 cities (shahar) and 1,067 urban-type settlements (shaharcha).

Most populous cities of Uzbekistan 
List of cities with population more than 100,000 in 2022.

See also

List of renamed cities in Uzbekistan
List of geographic names of Iranian origin
Lists of cities

References

 
 
Cities
Uzbekistan, List of cities in